Dan Ackerman (born March 13, 1974) is a former radio DJ turned technology and video game journalist. Ackerman resides in New York City and has written about video games and gadgets for publications including SPIN, Blender, WWE Magazine, and The Hollywood Reporter.

He is currently a senior editor at CNET.com and a regular TV talking head on outlets such as G4TV, CNN, MSNBC, Fox News and CNBC.  Ackerman co-hosted CNET's weekly Digital City and CNET Labcasts video podcast. Previously, Ackerman was the editor-in-chief of Clubplanet.com from 2001 to 2006, and a senior editor at UGO.com from 1999 to 2001. He has released four albums on the Helper Monkey Records label, including 2008's "Tales Out of Night School"<ref>[ allmusic 'Tales out of Night School' Overview </]</ref> and 2012's "The Futurist". He also appeared on a web show called "Play Value" along with his wife and other people in the video gaming industry. The show talked about the history of gaming such as "The Rise of Atari", or "The Death of The Arcade".

References

External links
CNET profile page
Digital City Podcast
Dan Ackerman Official website
Official website for Tales Out of Night School 
 

1974 births
Living people
American technology journalists
American male journalists